The Embassy of Peru in Berlin is the diplomatic mission of the Republic of Peru in Germany. The embassy is based in Taubenstraße, Berlin-Mitte; the ambassador is Elmer Schialer.

References

External links
Official site

Peru
Berlin